I Like America and America Likes Me, also known as Coyote, was a 1974 performance by conceptual artist Joseph Beuys.

Description 

In 1974, the German conceptual artist landed in a New York City airport whereupon assistants wrapped him in felt and brought him to the René Block Gallery in SoHo in an ambulance. There Beuys spent three consecutive days, for eight hours a day, living with a live coyote. Beuys attempted to connect with the animal by repeating symbolic gestures such as throwing leather gloves, gesticulating with a cane, and cloaking himself like a shepherd with the cane sticking out. The coyote was docile and occasionally hostile, tugging at the artist's felt. Beuys occasionally played a triangle and a tape recording of turbines.

At the end of the performance, Beuys, still wrapped in felt, returned home in the same manner whence he came.

Caroline Tisdall, Beuys's collaborator and travel companion, documented the performance in black and white photographs.

Symbolism 

At the time of this performance, Beuys was already well known as a provocative German visual artist who used materials—felt and animal fat—based on his mythologized personal history: As a downed fighter pilot, a Tartar tribesman nursed Beuys back to health by insulating him in those materials. The felt in which Beuys wrapped himself during I Like America and America Likes Me was a therapeutic and shamanic symbol for Beuys through which he and his "social sculptures" (such as this performance) sought to heal societal psychic wounds.

During this time, Beuys saw the United States as divided over its involvement in the Vietnam War and its racial divisions and subjugation, and wanted his performance to address the split between Native and European intelligence, the latter being more materialistic, mechanistic, and positivistic. His selection of the coyote, a Native American symbol of transformation and trickery, invoked its Native creation myth of the Promethean teacher teaching humans to survive. Whereas settlers viewed coyotes as an aggressive predator to be exterminated, to Beuys, the coyote symbolized America's spirit. Beuys felt that America needed to reckon with the coyote to lift its trauma. It was Beuys's first trip to the United States. He had refused prior invitations based on American involvement in the Vietnam War, but agreed to travel given the country's exit from the war.

The performance's title, I Like America and America Likes Me, also recalls the 7-Up soda advertising slogan, "You like it. It likes you." The piece is also known as Coyote.

Reception and legacy 

The performance's lesson, wrote Artsy, is that American societal trauma can only be healed through direct communication.

Artsy wrote that the piece's title, evoking the melting pot metaphor for Americanization, stood in contrast with the divisions Beuys saw in America.

Photographs from the performance were shown at the Edinburgh Festival, where they greatly affected the future artist Jimmy Boyle. The curator RoseLee Goldberg too found the photographs poetic, only to be changed by a video of the performance in which she saw the sadness of the coyote. Artifacts from the performance were later exhibited in "" ("News from the Coyote") at the Ronald Feldman Gallery.

References

Further reading 

 
 
 
 
 Joseph Beuys pp. 177–179

1974 in art
1970s photographs
May 1974 events in the United States
Works by Joseph Beuys
Performances